Maria Nikolayevna Prusakova (born 4 September 1983) is a Russian Communist politician. She was elected to the State Duma in the Rubtsovsk constituency in 2021.

Electoral history 

|-
! colspan=2 style="background-color:#E9E9E9;text-align:left;vertical-align:top;" |Candidate
! style="background-color:#E9E9E9;text-align:left;vertical-align:top;" |Party
! style="background-color:#E9E9E9;text-align:right;" |Votes
! style="background-color:#E9E9E9;text-align:right;" |%
|-
|style="background-color:"|
|align=left|Maria Prusakova
|align=left|Communist Party
|
|27.12%
|-
|style="background-color: " |
|align=left|Sergey Struchenko
|align=left|United Russia
|
|22.16%
|-
|style="background-color: " |
|align=left|Lyudmila Suslova
|align=left|A Just Russia — For Truth
|
|8.84%
|-
|style="background-color:"|
|align=left|Yelena Kurnosova
|align=left|Communists of Russia
|
|7.78%
|-
|style="background-color:"|
|align=left|Irina Shudra
|align=left|Liberal Democratic Party
|
|7.73%
|-
|style="background-color:"|
|align=left|Vladislav Vakayev
|align=left|New People
|
|7.72%
|-
|style="background-color:"|
|align=left|Viktor Dvornikov
|align=left|Party of Pensioners
|
|5.08%
|-
|style="background-color:"|
|align=left|Yevgeny Astakhovsky
|align=left|Rodina
|
|3.72%
|-
|style="background:"| 
|align=left|Andrey Krylov
|align=left|Yabloko
|
|3.13%
|-
|style="background:"| 
|align=left|Pavel Chesnov
|align=left|Russian Party of Freedom and Justice
|
|1.37%
|-
| colspan="5" style="background-color:#E9E9E9;"|
|- style="font-weight:bold"
| colspan="3" style="text-align:left;" | Total
| 
| 100%
|-
| colspan="5" style="background-color:#E9E9E9;"|
|- style="font-weight:bold"
| colspan="4" |Source:
|
|}

References 

1983 births
Living people
Communist Party of the Russian Federation members
Eighth convocation members of the State Duma (Russian Federation)
People from Barnaul
21st-century Russian women politicians
Altai State University alumni
20th-century Russian women